Vadim Vasilyevich Tolstopyatov (born 28 February 1982 in Soldatskaya Dukhovka, Tambov Oblast, RSFSR, Soviet Union) is a Russian ski-orienteering competitor. He received a silver medal in the sprint at the 2007 World Ski Orienteering Championships, behind Eduard Khrennikov, securing Russia a double victory in this distance.

References

External links

Living people
Russian orienteers
Male orienteers
Ski-orienteers
1982 births
Sportspeople from Tambov Oblast